Epeirotypus is a genus of ray spiders that was first described by Octavius Pickard-Cambridge in 1894.

Description 

Adult Epeirotypus species have a body length of 1–3 mm. The carapace ranges in colour from light yellow to almost black, and the head region is not elevated. The sternum is smooth, convex, and rounded to the rear. The abdomen is ovoid, usually with a dorsal pattern which varies by species and sometimes bearing posterior lateral tubercules. The legs are short and stout, light tan or sometimes dark with annulations. The femoral length is – the total width of the carapace, and the tarsi bear an irregular group of serrated hairs on the ventral side. 

They have eight eyes, all approximately equal in size. The AME are separated by half their diameter and the PME typically separated by their diameter.

Species 
 it contains three species, found in China, Costa Rica, and Mexico: E. brevipes, E. chavarria, and E. dalong.

See also
 List of Theridiosomatidae species

References

Further reading

Araneomorphae genera
Spiders of Central America
Spiders of China
Spiders of Mexico
Taxa named by Octavius Pickard-Cambridge
Theridiosomatidae